Iain B. MacDonald (born March 10) is an Irish and English director. He started his career making arts documentaries, most notably Gilbert & George Day Tripping, featuring the world renowned art duo Gilbert & George. 

He has directed a diverse range of projects such as Episodes, Wayne, Black Monday, and Survivor's Remorse. He also served as the producing director for Preacher and multiple seasons of Shameless.

In 2014 he was nominated for an Emmy for Outstanding Directing in a Comedy Series for his work on Episodes.

In 2022, Iain B. MacDonald married Zippy Guerin.

References

External links
 

Year of birth missing (living people)
Living people
British television directors